Ieuan Brydydd Hir (fl. 1450 – 1485) was a Welsh language poet from Ardudwy in Meirionnydd, north-west Wales. Hir sang on mainly religious subjects. Thirteen poems accepted as his work are extant, although a number of others are attributed to him.

Bibliography
M. Paul Bryant-Quinn (ed.), Gwaith Ieuan Brydydd Hir (Aberystwyth, 2000). The only full edition of his work.

Welsh-language poets
15th-century Welsh poets
Year of death unknown
Year of birth unknown